The following are the football (soccer) events of the year 1959 throughout the world.

Events
October 25 – Sparta Rotterdam makes a winning European debut by defeating Sweden's IFK Göteborg in the second round of the European Cup. All three goals for the Dutch side are scored by Joop Daniëls.

Winners club national championship
 : San Lorenzo
 : Bahia
 : Universidad de Chile
 : OGC Nice
 : Hapoel Petah Tikva F.C.
 : KR
 : A.C. Milan
 : Chivas Guadalajara
 : Sparta Rotterdam
 : Olimpia Asunción
 : FC Dynamo Moscow
 : Barcelona
 : Fenerbahçe
 : Eintracht Frankfurt

International tournaments
1959 British Home Championship (October 4, 1958 – April 11, 1959)

 African Cup of Nations in Egypt (May 22 – 29 1959)
 
 
 
 Pan American Games in Chicago, United States (August 21 – September 5, 1959)

Births

 January 23 — Eustorgio Sánchez, Venezuelan football goalkeeper
 February 7 — Sammy Lee (footballer), English international footballer and manager
 March 4 — Romeo Zondervan, Dutch international footballer
 March 20 — Roland Sikinger, American professional soccer player
 May 20 — Juan Carlos Letelier, Chilean international footballer
 May 26 — Róger Flores, Costa Rican international footballer
 July 25 — Fyodor Cherenkov; Soviet and Russian international footballer and manager (died 2014)
 July 31 — Wilmar Cabrera, Uruguayan international footballer
 September 4 — Fernando Alvez, Uruguayan international footballer
 November 11 — Mauricio Peña, Mexican footballer (died 2010)
 November 14 — José Figueroa, Honduran international footballer
 November 17 — Thomas Allofs, German international footballer
 November 22 — Marek Ostrowski, Polish international footballer (died 2017)
 November 28 — Pedro Acosta, Venezuelan international footballer
 December 11 — Thandwa Moreki, Botswana footballer
 December 19 — Edward Metgod, Dutch football goalkeeper and manager

Deaths

May 
 May 18 – Enrique Guaita, Argentine/Italian striker, winner of the 1934 FIFA World Cup and topscorer of the 1934-35 Serie A. (48)

November 
 November 8 – Heleno de Freitas, Brazilian striker, topscorer at the South American Championship 1945. (39)

References

 
Association football by year